Audio Sponge is the debut album by the electronica duo Sketch Show.

Track listing

Notes
 Mastered at Sterling Sound, NYC.
 "Gokigen Ikaga 1・2・3" is similar to the Blondie song "Rapture".

Personnel
Haruomi Hosono & Yukihiro Takahashi - Arranging, Mixing, Production
Ryuichi Sakamoto - Keyboards, Clavinet, Sampler
Yasuo Kimoto - Mixing, Production
Goh Hotoda, Yoshifumi Lio - Mixing
Towa Tei, Tadashi Matsuda - Mixing, Post Production
Tom Coyne - Mastering
Yuka Honda - Mastering Coordination
Hachiro Sugiyama - Art Direction, Photography
Tom Yoda - Coordination
Atsushi Matsui - Assistance
Yuichi Ishikura - Artists and repertoire
Shinji Hayashi, Masato Matsūra, Masakazu Satō, Haji Taniguchi - Executive Production

2002 debut albums
Sketch Show (band) albums